The NOFV-Oberliga Süd is the fifth tier of the German football league system in the southern states of the former East Germany. It covers the German states of Saxony-Anhalt, Thuringia, Saxony and southern Brandenburg. It is one of fourteen Oberligas in German football. Until the introduction of the 3. Liga in 2008 it was the fourth tier of the league system, and until the introduction of the Regionalligas in 1994 the third tier.

Overview 
The NOFV-Oberliga Sud was formed in 1991 when, along with the political reunion of Germany, the East German football league system was integrated into a unified German system.

The abbreviation NOFV stands for Nordostdeutscher Fußballverband, meaning North East German Football Association.

Along with this league, two other NOFV-Oberligen were formed, the NOFV-Oberliga Mitte and the NOFV-Oberliga Nord.

The league was formed from clubs from six different leagues: One club from the Oberliga Nordost, the former DDR-Oberliga, fourteen clubs from the NOFV-Liga A and B, the former East German second division, and one each from the three Verbandsligas, the new state leagues. The league accommodated therefore a wide mix of clubs from the east and west of Germany. Unlike the two other NOFV-Oberligas, it contained no clubs from Berlin, due to geographical reasons, and therefore was the only one of the three to have no West German clubs in it.

The league became one of the then ten Oberligen in the united Germany, the third tier of league football. Its champion was however not directly promoted to the 2nd Bundesliga but had to take part in a promotion play-off. In 1994 the league champion was successful in this competition, in 1992 and 1993 they failed.

For the duration of the league and onwards, the leagues below it are:

 Sachsenliga
 Thüringenliga
 Verbandsliga Sachsen-Anhalt, except clubs from the very north of the state
 Brandenburg-Liga, only clubs from the very south of the state

In 1994, the German football league system saw some major changes. The four Regionalligen were introduced as an intermediate level between 2nd Bundesliga and Oberligen, relegating the Oberligen to the fourth tier. In the east of Germany, the Regionalliga Nordost was formed, a league covering the area of former East Germany and western Berlin. Four clubs from the NOFV-Oberliga Süd were admitted to the new league:

 FC Rot-Weiß Erfurt
 FC Erzgebirge Aue
 FC Sachsen Leipzig 
 Bischofswerdaer FV 08

The NOFV-Oberliga Mitte was disbanded and its clubs spread between the two remaining Oberligen in the east. Four clubs from the former league were added to the NOFV-Oberliga Süd.

From 1995 to 1999, the champions of the league were directly promoted to the Regionalliga Nordost. 

With the reduction of the number of Regionalligen to two, the league came under the Regionalliga Nord. Six clubs were relegated that season from the now disbanded Regionalliga Nordost to the Oberliga. The regulations about promotion kept on changing and until 2006, the league champion had to play-off with the champion of the northern league for one promotion spot. Only in 2004 did the southern champion failed to win the play-off. From the 2006 season onwards, direct promotion was awarded again.

The league changes in 2008, with the introduction of the 3. Liga, meant the Oberligen were now the fifth tier of league football in Germany. The top three teams of the league in 2007–08 gained entry to the Regionalliga, the fourth placed team had to play-off against the fourth placed team from the north for one more spot, these teams being:

 Hallescher FC
 Chemnitzer FC
 VFC Plauen
 Sachsen Leipzig qualified for play-offs

Otherwise, the setup of the league did not change and its champion was directly promoted from the 2008-09 season onwards.

Another league reform, decided upon in 2010, will saw the reestablishment of the Regionalliga Nordost from 2012 onwards, with the two NOFV-Oberligas feeding into this league again. Three teams from the league achieved direct promotion to the new league, these being VfB Auerbach, Lokomotive Leipzig and FSV Zwickau.

Founding members of the league
The founding members of the league in 1991 were:

From the Oberliga Nordost:
 FC Sachsen Leipzig, now defunct
From the NOFV-Liga Staffel A:
 Fortschritt Bischofswerda, now Bischofswerdaer FV 08 
 Aktivist Schwarze Pumpe, now Hoyerswerdaer FC

From the Verbandsliga Sachsen:
 VFC Plauen

From the Verbandsliga Sachsen-Anhalt:
 SV Merseburg 99

From the Verbandsliga Thüringen:
 FV Zeulenroda, now FC Motor Zeulenroda

From the NOFV-Liga Staffel B:
 FSV Zwickau
 Wismut Aue, now Erzgebirge Aue
 Chemnitzer SV, now VfB Chemnitz
 Soemtrom Sömmerda, now FSV Sömmerda 
 Wismut Gera, then 1. SV Gera, merged to form FV Gera Süd, now Wismut again 
 1. FC Markkleeberg, club defunct, reformed as Kickers Markkleeberg
 TSG Meißen, now Meißner SV 08 
 Bornaer SV 
 Motor Weimar, now SC Weimar 03
 Stahl Riesa, disbanded, reformed
 1. Suhler SV 
 Wacker Nordhausen

League champions 
The league champions:

Placings in the league 
The complete list of clubs in the league and their final placings:

Notes
 1 1. FC Markkleeberg declared bankruptcy in 1994.
 2 VfB Leipzig II withdrew from the league in 2000 because the first team was relegated. VfB Leipzig folded in 2004 and reformed as 1. FC Lok Leipzig.
 3 VfL Halle 96 withdrew its team to the Verbandsliga in 2001.
 4 FV Dresden-Nord renamed itself SC Borea Dresden in 2007. The club withdrew from the league after four rounds of the 2011–12 season.
 5 1. FC Gera 03 withdrew from the league during the 2011–12 season.
 6 FC Sachsen Leipzig declared insolvency at the end of the 2010–11 season and folded.
 7 In 2009 SSV Markranstädt sold its Oberliga licence to RB Leipzig.
 8 Dynamo Dresden II, Chemnitzer FC II, Erzgebirge Aue II and Hallescher FC II withdrew from competition at the end of the 2014–15 season.
 9 BSG Wismut Gera was formed in 2007 in a merger of 1. SV Gera, Blau-Weiß Gera and Geraer KFC Dynamos, and withdrew from the league after the 2018–19 season.
 10 Rot-Weiß Erfurt II and FC Energie Cottbus II withdrew from the league at the end of the 2015–16 season.
 11 Wacker Nordhausen II withdrew from the league in 2020 because the first team was relegated.
 12 VfL 05 Hohenstein-Ernstthal withdrew from the league during the 2019–20 season.
 13 Carl Zeiss Jena II withdrew from competition at the end of the 2021–22 season.
 14 1. FC Merseburg withdrew from the league during the 2021–22 season.

Key

References

Sources 
 Deutschlands Fußball in Zahlen,  An annual publication with tables and results from the Bundesliga to Verbandsliga/Landesliga. DSFS.
 Kicker Almanach,  The yearbook on German football from Bundesliga to Oberliga, since 1937. Kicker Sports Magazine.
 Die Deutsche Liga-Chronik 1945-2005  History of German football from 1945 to 2005 in tables. DSFS. 2006.

External links 
 Weltfussball.de Round-by-round results and tables of the NOFV-Oberliga Süd from 1994 onwards 
 NOFV-Oberliga Süd at fussballdaten.de 
 Nordostdeutscher Fußballverband (NOFV) 

NOFV-Oberliga
Oberliga (football)
Football competitions in Brandenburg
Football competitions in Saxony
Football competitions in Saxony-Anhalt
Football competitions in Thuringia
1991 establishments in Germany
Sports leagues established in 1991